Ahmed Musa (born 14 October 1992) is a Nigerian professional footballer who plays as a forward and left winger for Turkish Süper Lig club Sivasspor and the Nigeria national team.

Musa became the first Nigerian to score more than once in a FIFA World Cup match, after scoring twice against Argentina in the 2014 FIFA World Cup. Musa is also the first Nigerian to score in two FIFA World Cup competitions, after scoring twice against Iceland in the group stage of the 2018 FIFA World Cup. With currently 107 appearances, he is Nigeria's most capped player since November 2021. Musa was a member of the Al Nassr squad that won the Saudi Premier League and Saudi Super Cup, both in 2019.

Club career

Musa began his career in the GBS Football Academy.

Breakthrough in Nigeria
In 2008, Musa was loaned to JUTH F.C. where he played 18 games, scoring four goals in his first two professional seasons for the Healers. He was subsequently loaned to Kano Pillars F.C., in the 2009–10 season where he set the league record scoring multiple crucial goals as Pillars finished second.

Musa held the record for the highest goals ever scored in one season in the history of the Nigeria Premier League until November 2011, when Jude Aneke of Kaduna United F.C. set a new record of 20 goals.

VVV-Venlo
Musa was transferred to Dutch club VVV-Venlo in summer 2010, but the move was held up because he was only 17 years of age and therefore not eligible for an ITC in accordance with the current FIFA rules. He was officially eligible to play for VVV-Venlo on 14 October 2010 when he eventually turned 18 years of age.

Less than a week after arriving at the club, Musa made his debut for VVV-Venlo against FC Groningen on 30 October. He started the game for VVV-Venlo, was fouled in the 50th minute and received a penalty kick.

Rated by Goal.com amongst the Hot 100 young football stars in the world to watch in 2011,
Lolade Adewuyi of Goal.com put him on the list of Top Ten Nigerian International Players of 2010 and was also included in IFFHS list of the best 140 players in the world.

On 8 March 2011, Ahmed Musa won the AIT footballer of the year award (national). The ceremony was held at the Presidential Hotel, Port Harcourt, Rivers State. The event had in attendance, BBC African Footballer of the Year winner, Ghanaian Asamoah Gyan and the top officials from the Nigerian football federation including the president Aminu Maigari.

In April, Venlo's football director Mario Captien said that representatives of Tottenham Hotspur had visited the club regarding the player, also Ajax scout Tijani Babangida said that Ajax were interested in Musa but that the outcome would be decided at the end of the season.

On 1 May 2011, Musa hit a brace to sink Feyenoord 3–2 and end any lingering fears of automatic relegation from the Eredivisie.

In August 2011, after returning from the 2011 FIFA U-20 World Cup in Colombia, Musa made his first appearance of the 2011–12 season at home against AFC Ajax and scored two goals.

In September VVV-Venlo chairman Hai Berden disclosed on Eredivisie Live that VVV-Venlo had turned down a last minute bid of €10 million for Musa from the Bundesliga. The name of the Bundesliga club was not disclosed.

CSKA Moscow

On 7 January 2012, Musa signed for Russian side CSKA Moscow for an undisclosed fee.

On 17 September 2014 he scored an 82nd minute consolation goal in a 5–1 UEFA Champions League away rout to A.S. Roma. On 1 June 2015, Musa signed a new four-year contract with CSKA until the end of the 2018–19 season. He finished the 2015–16 Russian Premier League season as the 5th highest scorer, becoming one of only seven players aged 23 or younger to reach double figures for goals in each of the past two seasons in Europe's top seven leagues.

Leicester City
On 8 July 2016, Musa moved to Leicester City for a club record £16.6 million. He scored his first goals with the club in a friendly against Barcelona in the 2016 International Champions Cup which ended in a 4–2 loss. He made his Premier League debut on 13 August 2016 in the club's opening day 2–1 defeat to Hull City. He scored his first Premier League goal with the opener in a 3–1 victory over Crystal Palace on 22 October 2016.

By January 2017, Musa was yet to register an assist for the club, contributing an average of 0.5 key passes, 0.3 crosses and 1.2 successful dribbles per game.

Loan return to CSKA Moscow
On 30 January 2018, Musa returned to CSKA Moscow on loan for the remainder of the 2017–18 season.

On 4 August 2018, Musa moved to Saudi Arabian side Al Nassr on a permanent deal. In October 2020, Al Nassr announced that Musa was leaving. It was reported that Premier League club West Bromwich Albion was expected to complete a move for Ahmed Musa in the January transfer window for the 2020–21 season.

Return to Kano Pillars
On 13 April 2021, Musa rejoined Nigerian club Kano Pillars until the end of the 2020–21 season.

International career

In April 2010 under Coach Lars Lagerbäck, he was called up to join the Nigeria national football team camp prior to the 2010 FIFA World Cup in South Africa after helping the Nigerian team win in the 2010 WAFU Nations Cup where he scored a goal against Benin. In the same tournament against Burkina Faso, Musa's goal deep into extra-time shot Nigeria into the finals of the tournament in Abeokuta. He was however forced out of the Super Eagles' 30-man World Cup roster due to an ankle injury.

On 5 August 2010, at the age of 17, Musa made his debut for the Nigeria senior team in a qualification match for the 2012 Africa Cup of Nations against Madagascar, where he came on as a substitute for Mikel John Obi in a 2–0 win. Musa scored his first goal for the Super Eagles in a March 2011 friendly against Kenya.

In April 2011, Ahmed Musa was included in the Nigeria national under-20 football team squad to represent the nation in the 2011 African Youth Championship qualifiers, even though VVV Venlo had declared him unavailable for the tournament due to club commitments. After some intense negotiations with the Nigerian Federation, VVV Venlo and Musa's representatives it was agreed that Musa will shuttle between the Netherlands and South Africa to participate in the tournament with the national team.
After the opening game against defending champions Ghana, Musa won the most valuable player award and boarded the next flight back to the Netherlands.

In August 2011, Musa represented Nigeria U20 in the 2011 FIFA U-20 World Cup held in Colombia, where he scored three goals in five matches. Musa was included by FIFA in shortlist of 10 candidates for the Adidas Golden Ball, which was awarded to the most outstanding player of the FIFA U-20 World Cup.

On 7 December 2011, Ahmed Musa was one of the four nominees named for the Confederation of African Football Most Promising Talent Award, however the award went to Ivory Coast's Souleymane Coulibaly.

Musa was called up to Nigeria's 23-man squad for the 2013 Africa Cup of Nations. He scored in a 4–1 semi-final defeat of Mali and appeared as a substitute against Burkina Faso in the final, as the Super Eagles won their third continental title. Overall, he appeared in five of the team's six matches. At the 2013 FIFA Confederations Cup, he started in all three of the team's matches as they were eliminated in the group stage.

After appearing in all of Nigeria's qualifying matches, Musa was named in Stephen Keshi's squad for the 2014 FIFA World Cup. He scored two goals in the team's final Group F match, a 3–2 defeat to Argentina.

In October 2015, following the retirement of Vincent Enyeama from international football, Nigerian coach, Sunday Oliseh named Musa as the captain of the team. This decision was however reversed in 2016 as Mikel John Obi was named captain of the Nigerian squad and Musa was moved to Vice Captain.

In May 2018 he was named in Nigeria's preliminary 30-man squad for the 2018 FIFA World Cup in Russia. Though his performance against Iceland was superb, it was not enough to keep the West Africans in the tournament as they were eliminated by Argentina On 22 June 2018, Musa scored twice in a 2–0 victory over Iceland in their second group match of the World Cup. In June 2019 he became the third most capped player for Nigeria's national team, surpassing Nwankwo Kanu, after appearing in a friendly against Zimbabwe. He was named in the 2019 Africa Cup of Nations team by head coach Gernot Rohr. He was also part of the Nigerian squad at the 2021 edition of the African Cup of Nations (AFCON) held in Cameroun.

Personal life
He was born from a multi-religious family, with his mother Sarah Musa (née Moses) being a Christian from Edo state in the Southern part of Nigeria.

In April 2017, Musa was involved in a dispute with his estranged wife Jamila, resulting in the police being called to his home. Shortly afterwards, the couple were divorced following "irreconcilable differences". On 23 May, Musa married Juliet Ejue at Abuja.

In October 2017, Musa purchased a second petrol station in Nigeria.

On 24 January 2019, Musa confirmed the news of the death of his mother Sarah Musa on his Twitter page. She had previously been ill.

Career statistics

Club

International

Scores and results list Nigeria's goal tally first, score column indicates score after each Musa goal.

Honours

CSKA
 Russian Premier League: 2012–13, 2013–14, 2015–16
 Russian Cup: 2012–13
 Russian Super Cup: 2013, 2014

Al-Nassr
 Saudi Professional League: 2018–19
 Saudi Super Cup: 2019

Nigeria U20
 African Youth Championship: 2011

Nigeria
 WAFU Nations Cup: 2010
 Africa Cup of Nations: 2013

Individual
 Nigeria Premier League Top Scorer: 2009–10
 In the list of 33 best football players of the championship of Russia: 2012–13
 Russian Cup Top Scorer: 2012–13
 CAF Team of the Year: 2014

See also

References

External links

1992 births
Living people
Nigerian Muslims
Sportspeople from Jos
Nigerian footballers
JUTH F.C. players
Kano Pillars F.C. players
VVV-Venlo players
PFC CSKA Moscow players
Leicester City F.C. players
Al Nassr FC players
Fatih Karagümrük S.K. footballers
Sivasspor footballers
Nigeria Professional Football League players
Eredivisie players
Russian Premier League players
Premier League players
Saudi Professional League players
Süper Lig players
Association football forwards
Nigeria international footballers
Nigeria under-20 international footballers
2013 Africa Cup of Nations players
2013 FIFA Confederations Cup players
2014 FIFA World Cup players
2018 FIFA World Cup players
2019 Africa Cup of Nations players
2021 Africa Cup of Nations players
Africa Cup of Nations-winning players
Nigerian expatriate footballers
Expatriate footballers in the Netherlands
Expatriate footballers in Russia
Expatriate footballers in England
Expatriate footballers in Saudi Arabia
Expatriate footballers in Turkey
Nigerian expatriate sportspeople in the Netherlands
Nigerian expatriate sportspeople in Russia
Nigerian expatriate sportspeople in England
Nigerian expatriate sportspeople in Saudi Arabia
Nigerian expatriate sportspeople in Turkey
FIFA Century Club